Kaw Valley USD 321 is a public unified school district headquartered in St. Marys, Kansas, United States.  The district includes the communities of St. Marys,  Delia, Emmett, Rossville, Willard, Saint Clere, and nearby rural areas.

Schools
The school district operates the following schools:
 St. Marys Jr/Sr High School
 Rossville Jr/Sr High School
 St. Marys Grade School
 Rossville Grade School

See also
 Kansas State Department of Education
 Kansas State High School Activities Association
 List of high schools in Kansas
 List of unified school districts in Kansas

References

External links
 

School districts in Kansas